Samu Tuomaala (born 8 January 2003) is a Finnish professional ice hockey forward who is currently playing with Oulun Kärpät in the Liiga on loan as a prospect under contract to the Philadelphia Flyers of the National Hockey League (NHL).

Playing career
Tuomaala made his professional debut playing with Kärpät of the Finnish Liiga. Tuomaala was a top-rated prospect in the 2021 NHL Entry Draft., and was selected in the second-round, 46th overall, by the Philadelphia Flyers.

On 15 August 2021, Tuomaala immediately moved to North America following the draft and was signed to a three-year, entry-level contract with the Flyers.

References

External links
 

2003 births
Living people
Finnish ice hockey right wingers
Lehigh Valley Phantoms players
Oulun Kärpät players
Philadelphia Flyers draft picks
Sportspeople from Oulu